Gernot Fraydl (born 10 December 1939) is an Austrian retired footballer and coach.

References

External links
 Gernot Fraydl at Austria Archiv 
 Gernot Fraydl at Sturm Archiv 
 Gernot Fraydl at Austria Soccer 
 

1939 births
Living people
Austrian footballers
Austria international footballers
Association football goalkeepers
Bundesliga players
National Professional Soccer League (1967) players
North American Soccer League (1968–1984) players
Grazer AK players
FK Austria Wien players
SW Bregenz players
Philadelphia Spartans players
St. Louis Stars (soccer) players
Hertha BSC players
TSV 1860 Munich players
First Vienna FC players
Austrian football managers
SK Sturm Graz managers
Grazer AK managers